The George Carlin Show is an American sitcom that aired Sunday at 9:30 pm on the Fox network from January 1994 to July 1995. It was created jointly by Sam Simon and the show's namesake, comedian George Carlin.

Synopsis
The action was centered on George O'Grady (George Carlin), a taxicab driver living in New York City. Most of the scenes took place in The Moylan Tavern, owned and run by bartender Jack Donahue (Anthony Starke), who had inherited the establishment from his father. The setting's real-life basis was the actual, now-defunct Moylan Tavern, a bar that existed during Carlin's childhood on Broadway between La Salle Street and Tiemann Place in the Morningside Heights neighborhood, and owned by the grandparents of film critic and author Maitland McDonagh. As Carlin recalled in 1994, "It was where I saw Oswald shot. It was where I headed during the [1965] blackout. The Moylan is where I came of age." The name of the show's bartender character, Jack Donahue, was taken from that of real-life owner Jimmy Donahue, who bought the bar from the original owners. The set itself, however, resembled another upper-Broadway bar, Carlin said: "Cannon's—where my father used to drink."

Cast

Main
 George Carlin as George O'Grady, a New York city cabdriver and regular patron of The Moylan Tavern
 Alex Rocco as Harry Rossetti, George's best friend, an ex-con bookie
 Paige French as Sydney Paris, waitress at The Moylan, and aspiring model/actress
 Anthony Starke as Jack Donahue, bartender/owner of The Moylan
 Christopher Rich as Dr. Neil Beck, a plastic surgeon who is quite unlike the blue-collar Moylan regulars
 Mike Hagerty as Frank MacNamara, a working-class Moylan's regular

Recurring
The following characters appeared in at least 5 episodes: 
 Susan Sullivan as Kathleen Rachowski, a pet-shop owner and George's girlfriend
 Phil LaMarr as Bob Brown, a friend of George's during season 1
 Matt Landers as Larry Pinkerton, an ex-cop who lives in George's building and hangs out with George at The Moylan
 Iqbal Theba as Inzamamulhaq Siddiqui, a fellow cabdriver of George's

Note that while Sullivan appeared in publicity cast photos, she appeared in only 7 episodes, receiving "Special Guest Star" billing in the closing credits.

Episodes

Season 1 (1994)

Season 2 (1994–95)

George Carlin's criticism

Carlin noted on his website:

He later elaborated in his posthumously published autobiography Last Words:

He went on to speak in the book of not enjoying the committee-style writer's room, which he felt alienated anyone who was not a professional television writer.

Simon in 2013 addressed Carlin's comments, saying:

Reception
The show received an approval rating of 88% on review aggregator Rotten Tomatoes, based on eight reviews.

Todd Everett of Variety, gave the show a positive review, saying: "The Moylan Tavern -- and Carlin's aging hipster character translates well to the sitcom stage. This is the comic without much of the acid that frequently flows in his standup routines. It's a half hour that's easy to take, and Carlin fans won't be disappointed."

David Hiltbrand of People Magazine, also gave a positive review of the show, saying: "The sitcom’s flavor is somewhat bland, with just a whiff of desperation about it. But the mix of characters is likable, and how many Fox shows can you say that about?”

References

External links 
 
 

1990s American sitcoms
1990s American workplace comedy television series
1994 American television series debuts
1995 American television series endings
English-language television shows
Fox Broadcasting Company original programming
Television shows set in New York City
Television series by Warner Bros. Television Studios
George Carlin